Ruth Strauss (born 14 March 1963) is a former English professional squash player.

Strauss lived in Barling, Essex. She started playing squash aged 12 at her local Courtlands Park Club and won the British Under-19 title in 1978. Further success came when she won the British Under-23 title twice and represented England in the 1983 World Team Squash Championships.

External links
 

English female squash players
1963 births
Living people
20th-century English women
People from Rochford District